Hellborn may refer to:

People
Louis Sussmann-Hellborn (1828 – 1908), German sculptor, painter, art collector and contractor

Culture
Hellborn (album), 2007 album by David Shankle Group
Hellborn, alternate title for  2003 horror film Asylum of the Damned
Hellborn, 1993 film directed by Henry Bederski and Edward D. Wood Jr.